The 1998 Liga Sudamericana de Básquetbol, or 1998 FIBA South American League, was the third edition of the second-tier tournament for professional basketball clubs from South America. The tournament began on 4 February 1998 and finished on 12 May 1998. Defending champions Atenas won their second title, defeating Brazilian club Cougar Franca in the Grand Finals.

Format
Teams were split into four groups of four teams each, and played each other in a home-and-away round-robin format. The top two teams from each group advanced to the final stage, a best-of-three direct playoff elimination where the champion was decided.

Teams

Group stage

Group A

Group B

Group C

Group D

Final stage

Finals rosters
Atenas Cordoba: Marcelo Milanesio, Steve Edwards, Darrell Anderson, Fabricio Oberto, Diego Osella - Héctor Campana, Leandro Palladino. Coach: Rubén Magnano 

Cougar Franca: Helinho, Demétrius Conrado Ferraciú, Chuí, Rogério Klafke, Jose Vargas - Christopher Knights. Coach: Hélio Rubens 

Season MVP: Fabricio Oberto

References

Liga Sudamericana
1998